"Smile" is a song by American hip hop group G-Unit, released on April 8, 2004, as the fourth and final single from their debut album, Beg for Mercy (2003).  The song was produced by No I.D. and contains a sample "I Too Am Wanting", as performed by Syreeta.

Background
Lloyd Banks is the main artist on the song, with his G-Unit cohort 50 Cent, only singing "be the reason you smile" as a background vocal on the refrain as well as giving the intro.

Music video
The video goes through Lloyd Banks' life from a child to an adult, as he gets involved in love interests and relationships. It features Banks' two brothers, who play him at different points in his life. Former G-Unit Records artist, Olivia, is the adult girl featured in the video. The video was directed by Jessy Terrero.

Chart positions

References

2004 singles
G-Unit songs
Music videos directed by Jessy Terrero
Contemporary R&B ballads
Song recordings produced by No I.D.
Interscope Records singles
Songs written by 50 Cent
Songs written by Lloyd Banks
2003 songs
G-Unit Records singles